The Birchmount Loop marked the easternmost extension of the Toronto Transit Commission (TTC) streetcar system.  
When it was built the old City of Toronto's eastern boundary ended at Victoria Park Avenue, and extending the Kingston Road streetcar east to Birchmount Road took it deep into the Township of Scarborough, Ontario. However, the TTC's Scarboro radial line, originally a privately operated line, continued farther east until 1936.

When the TTC was created in 1921 it started to build streetcar service farther east.
They first extended double track TTC service to the current Bingham Loop, at Victoria Park Avenue, in 1922 replacing a portion of the Scarboro radial.

The TTC stopped running Kingston Road streetcars as far as the Birchmount Loop in 1954 after the introduction of a new fare zone system and a reorganization of the suburban bus network.
The streetcar route was transferred to Scarborough bus route, 86 Scarboro and now as 12 Kingston Road. The site of the old loop on the southeast corner is now occupied by a series of homes.

References

External links

Toronto streetcar loops